Zabalegui is a locality and council located in the municipality of Noáin, in Navarre province, Spain, Spain. As of 2020, it has a population of 46.

Geography 
Zabalegui is located 13km south-southeast of Pamplona.

References

Populated places in Navarre